Green Morris Farm was a historic home, farm, and national historic district located near Charlotte, Mecklenburg County, North Carolina. The district encompassed two contributing buildings and one contributing site in rural Mecklenburg County.  The farmhouse was built about 1870, and was a two-story, three-bay I-house with two one-story rear additions.  It had a hipped roof and blend of vernacular Greek Revival / Italianate style design elements.  The front facade featured a one-story, facade-width porch topped by a center-bay balcony. Other contributing resources were a machinery shed (c. 1920) and the agricultural landscape. It has been demolished.

It was added to the National Register of Historic Places in 1991.

References

Farms on the National Register of Historic Places in North Carolina
Houses on the National Register of Historic Places in North Carolina
Historic districts on the National Register of Historic Places in North Carolina
Greek Revival houses in North Carolina
Italianate architecture in North Carolina
Houses completed in 1870
Houses in Mecklenburg County, North Carolina
National Register of Historic Places in Mecklenburg County, North Carolina